Epione is a genus of moths in the family Geometridae first described by Philogène Auguste Joseph Duponchel in 1829.

Species
 Epione emundata (Christoph, 1880)
 Epione exaridaria (Graeser, 1890)
 Epione repandaria (Hufnagel, 1767)
 Epione vespertaria (Linnaeus, 1767)

References

Ourapterygini
Taxa named by Philogène Auguste Joseph Duponchel